The following highways are numbered 483:

Ireland
 R484 regional road

Japan
 Japan National Route 484

Spain
Autovía A-484

United States
 Interstate 484 (cancelled)
 Kentucky Route 484
 Maryland Route 484 (former)
 Pennsylvania Route 484
 Puerto Rico Highway 484
 Texas State Highway Loop 484